Ruby Red is an album by the American alternative rock band the Dambuilders, released in 1995. It was the band's first major label album made up of completely new material.

Production
The album was produced by Don Gehman. Its lyrics are by the singer and bass player Dave Derby; all four band members wrote the music. Gehman encouraged the band to think more about its vocal harmonies, and the intertwining of Derby's and Joan Wasser's voices.

Critical reception

Trouser Press wrote that "there are some good songs, and Derby does some nice things vocally—his falsetto on 'Down' would give Radiohead’s Thom Yorke a run for his money —but it’s a letdown from a band that has rarely disappointed in the past." SF Weekly thought that "Derby's lyrics alternately capture the urge to move (down the highway, into the stratosphere) and the realization that you're often literally or figuratively stuck in one space." The Nashville Scene deemed the album full of "bombastic would-be anthems and strained power ballads." 

CMJ New Music Monthly called it "a crystal-clear confection of hooky, muscular guitar riffs and occasional flights of fiddle." The Boston Globe opined that the band "has shifted away from dissonance (good move) while retaining the punk, punch and power." The Wisconsin State Journal stated that the songs "coolly incorporate violins and creative guitar work to create a uniquely creepy, undeniably compelling rock sound."

AllMusic called the album "a raw, unpretentious indie masterpiece that seems to have had few champions."

Track listing

Personnel
Dave Derby - vocals, bass
Joan Wasser - violin
Kevin March - drums
Eric Masunaga - guitar

References

1995 albums
East West Records albums